L'État de Grace is a 2006 French mini-series directed by Pascal Chaumeil.

Plot
L'État de Grace is a comedy about power, politics, and the place of women today and their relationships with men. It features the first woman president of France, Grace played by Anne Consigny.

Cast

Anne Consigny	... 	Grace Bellanger
Frédéric Pierrot	... 	Xavier
Zinedine Soualem	... 	Jean-Jacques Chrétien
Yves Jacques	... 	Bertrand Saint-Amor
André Marcon	... 	Victor Tage
Martine Chevallier	... 	Lise
Marie-Sohna Conde	... 	Virginie Morelle
Farida Ouchani	... 	Amalia Belkassem
Dominique Thomas	... 	Pablo Gonzales
Raphaël Lenglet	... 	Lionel
Thierry Godard	... 	Cyril Tesson
Michelle Goddet	... 	Clémence Acera
Momosse	        ... 	Jean-Paul
Francis Leplay	... 	Cédric Pierrot
Ahmed Elkourachi	... 	Karim Belkassem
Jérôme Bertin	... 	Pascal Anvers
Daniel Martin	... 	Sébastien Orsini
Eric Naggar	... 	Hippolyte Gardon
Pierre Poirot	... 	Julien Debarre
Blandine Pélissier	... 	Maria Monteuil
Boris Rehlinger	... 	Frédéric Castelneau
Gérard Bôle du Chaumont	... 	Fabien Dumez
Christophe Barbier	... 	Christophe Hétier
Stéphane Roquet	... 	Jean-Pierre, envoyé spécial
Paya Bruneau	... 	Séverine, envoyée spéciale
Vladimir Melechtchouk      ... 	Vladimir Zadkine
Jacques Bondoux	... 	Gilbert Letaye
Lucien Jean-Baptiste	... 	Fred Brago
Brigitte Tourtchaninoff	... 	Ruta Kreiviene
François Clavier	... 	Colonel Éric Grand-Pierre
Annick Roux	... 	Monique Breillat-Sempé
Valérie Dashwood	... 	Delphine Aubagne
Carlo Ferrante	... 	Marcello
Jean-Christophe Pagnac	... 	Jean-Christophe
Grégory Fitoussi	... 	Doctor Dan Odelman
Jézabel Marques	... 	Sylvie Fontaine
Nicolas Pignon	... 	Pierre Antonin
Joseph Chanet	... 	M. Tian Congming
Patrick Bonnel	... 	Général Jean-Marc Englein
John Arnold    	... 	Arnaud Brice-Forte
Emiliano Suarez	... 	Fernando Portillo
Jean-Pierre Becker	... 	Erwan Gessu
Yoav Krief	        ... 	Amine Belkassen
Océane Drame       ... 	Jamila Belkassem
Daniel Kenigsberg	... 	Jean-Yves Montausier
Hector De Malba	... 	Nelson Moretti-Bermudez
Gabrielle Centanini... 	Yvette Cardinal
François Berland	... 	Professeur Éric Alban
Michel Chaigneau	... 	Jean- Bernard Buisson
Danielle Durou	... 	Jacqueline Maillet (as Danièle Durou)
Floriant   	... 	Gérald Azzia
Hélène Alexandridis... 	Élisabeth Guignard
Claude Lévèque     ... 	Tristan Chéneaux
Hervé Falloux	... 	Fabien Cortez
Fabien Orcier	... 	Étienne Garcia-Finel
Marie-Philomène Nga... 	Mamadou Macky Kébé
Pierre Gérard	... 	Fabrice Étienne
Malika Alaoui	... 	Ezina Belkassem
Denis Ménochet	... 	The taxi driver
Pascal N'Zonzi	... 	The taxi driver
Philippe Laudenbach ...    The server

External links

French political drama television series
2006 French television series debuts
2006 French television series endings
Television shows set in France